Serial art is an art movement in which uniform elements or objects were assembled in accordance with strict modular principles. The composition of serial art is a systematic process.

Overview
An early example of serial art is Constantin Brâncuși's sculpture Endless Column.

One type of serial art is the production of multiple objects (paintings, sculptures, etc.) in sets or series, for example Josef Albers' well-known series of “square” paintings, where a single, repeating image creates a variation series. This technique later became associated with minimalism, the “multiple”, and “ABC art”. However, there is a different type, which may be regarded as more essentially “serial” because it is “characterized by the nonhierarchical juxtaposition of equivalent representations, which only yield their complete meaning on the basis of their mutual relationship”. This produces sequential structures defined similarly to those of a twelve-tone row, found for example in Max Bill's series, Fünfzehn Variationen über ein Thema (1934–38), and in Richard Paul Lohse's 30 vertikale systematische Farbreihen in gelber Rautenform (1943–70) and Konkretion III (1947).

Sol LeWitt wrote that "the serial artist does not attempt to produce a beautiful or mysterious object but functions merely as a clerk cataloguing the results of his premise."

See also
Conceptual art
Contemporary art
Formalism (art)
Geometric abstraction
Hard-edge painting 
Information art
Minimalism 
Modernism
Modular constructivism
Op Art
Post-modernism
Serialism
Structuralism
Systems art

Notes

References
 Guderian, Dietmar. 1985. “Serielle Strukturen und harmonikale Systeme.” In Vom Klang der Bilder: die Musik in der Kunst des 20. Jahrhunderts, edited by Karin von Maur, 434–37. Munich: Prestel-Verlag.
 Hunter, Sam, and John Jacobus. 1986 Modern Art . Englewod Cliffs, NJ: Prentice-Hall Inc; New York: Harry Abrams Inc.
 Sykora, Katharina. 1983. Das Phänomen des Seriellen in der Kunst: Aspekte einer künstlerischen Methode von Monet bis zur amerikanischen Pop Art. Würzburg: Könighausen + Neumann.

Further reading
 Bandur, Markus. 2001. Aesthetics of Total Serialism: Contemporary Research from Music to Architecture. Basel, Boston and Berlin: Birkhäuser.
 Bochner, Mel. 1967. "The Serial Attitude". Artforum 6, no. 4 (December): 28–33.
 Gerstner, Karl. 1964. Designing Programmes: Four Essays and an Introduction, with an introduction to the introduction by Paul Gredinger. English version by D. Q. Stephenson. Teufen, Switzerland: Arthur Niggli. Enlarged, new edition 1968.
 Pias, Claus. 2006. "Multiple". DuMonts Begriffslexikon zur zeitgenössischen Kunst, second, revised edition, edited by Hubertus Butin, 219–24. Cologne: DuMont-Buchverlag.

External links
Sol LeWitt, Serial Project, I (ABCD). Museum of Modern Art website 
Chronology mentioning Serial art and related movements

 
Art movements
Contemporary art movements
Modern art
20th century in art